Visions of the 10th Chamber is a compilation of songs by various Wu-affiliates compiled by Popa Wu.

Track listing
New Improved - (4:25) Manchuz ft. Kendra
I Ain't Playin' No More - (4:23) Lady Raw
Life of a Gangster - (4:08) Cuffie Crime Family
Who's Got Game - (3:55) Don Chulo
Three Amigo's (If It's On) - (3:43) King Just, Sic, & Method Man
Red Rum - (3:41) Da Manchuz
Simply Ludicrous - (2:49) North Star ft. Black Knights
Back of the Church - (4:02) Zu Ninjaz
Sundown - (4:06) United Kingdom & Cuffie Crime Family
You're My Everything - (4:26) King Just
I Like to Ride It - (3:44) Lady Raw
Never Shit Where You Eat - (5:09) United Kingdom
Prepare For The Buddha Monk - (5:01) Brooklyn Zu, Manchuz, & Ol' Dirty Bastard
Come One, Come All - (4:39) Cuffie Crime Family
How It Goes - (4:35) La the Darkman
Gangster Theme - (5:21) Cuffie Crime Family

References

2000 compilation albums
Hip hop compilation albums
Albums produced by RZA